Gamsung Camping  is a South Korean variety show program on JTBC starring Park Na-rae, Ahn Young-mi, Park So-dam, Son Na-eun, and Solar. The show airs on JTBC starting October 13, 2020. It is broadcast by JTBC on Tuesday at 23:00 (KST).

Broadcast timing has moved to Fridays at 21:00 (KST) from November 20, 2020.

Synopsis 
This is a camping entertainment program where female stars who want to travel can enjoy 2 days and 1 night on vacation in Korea.

Casts 
Park Na-rae
Ahn Young-mi
Park So-dam
Son Na-eun
Solar

Episodes

Ratings

International broadcast
 In Indonesia, Gamsung Camping is available for streaming online via Viu.

References

External links 
 Official website 

JTBC original programming
South Korean variety television shows
South Korean television shows
South Korean reality television series
Korean-language television shows
2020 South Korean television series debuts
2021 South Korean television series endings